Walter Edge "Moose" Foran (May 14, 1919 – December 8, 1986) was an American Republican Party politician from New Jersey, who served in both houses of the New Jersey Legislature. He followed in the footsteps of his father, Arthur F. Foran, who served in the New Jersey Senate.

Biography
Foran was born in Flemington, the fourth of five sons to Elizabeth and Arthur F. Foran. His eldest sibling, Dick Foran, would go on to be a B-movie actor. Walter Edge Foran was named in honor of Walter Evans Edge, his father's political mentor. Arthur F. Foran had already served as Mayor of Flemington before working as an aide to Edge, then Governor of New Jersey, in 1917. By the time of Walter Foran's birth in May 1919, Edge had been elected to the United States Senate.

After graduating from Staunton Military Academy in Virginia, Foran attended the University of North Carolina at Chapel Hill. He served in the Army field artillery in World War II.

Foran served as the Hunterdon County Republican Chairman from 1961 to 1970. He was elected to the New Jersey State Assembly in 1969 and served as a member of the Joint Appropriations Committee, eventually becoming Minority Leader.  He was elected to the New Jersey Senate in 1977, taking the seat of Anne Clark Martindell, a Democrat who resigned to serve in a series of positions in the Carter administration including United States Ambassador to New Zealand. He won a special election to fill the remainder of Martindell's term as well as the general election for a full four-year term in the 14th legislative district. After redistricting, he was re-elected to the Senate in 1981 and 1983 representing the 23rd district.

Foran was considered an "old school statesman" and "an imposing figure" (hence the nickname "Moose"), who had "a congenial and persuasive manner and a quick mind." In the Senate Foran was the ranking Republican on the Revenue, Finance and Appropriations Committee. After his death, a special election to fill his seat was won by Dick Zimmer, then serving in the Assembly.

On the Cook College campus of Rutgers University, Walter E. Foran Hall was dedicated on October 30, 1995. It is a  complex housing the Biotechnology Center for Agriculture and the Environment, the Department of Plant Biology and Pathology, and the Chang Science Library. Foran was an early champion of agricultural biotechnology and was instrumental in the founding of the center.

A resident of Flemington, Foran died of lung cancer at Hunterdon Medical Center at the age of 67 on December 8, 1986.

References

External links
Walter Edge Foran entry from The Political Graveyard
Collection Guides: Senator Walter Edge Foran (1919-1986), New Jersey Division of Archives & Records Management

|-

|-

|-

|-

1919 births
1986 deaths
United States Army personnel of World War II
Deaths from cancer in New Jersey
Deaths from lung cancer
Republican Party members of the New Jersey General Assembly
Republican Party New Jersey state senators
People from Flemington, New Jersey
Politicians from Hunterdon County, New Jersey
Staunton Military Academy alumni
University of North Carolina at Chapel Hill alumni
United States Army soldiers
20th-century American politicians